is a Prefectural Natural Park in Ehime Prefecture, Japan. Established in 1964, the park spans the borders of the municipalities of Kumakōgen, Seiyo, and Uchiko. The park's central feature is the eponymous .

See also
 National Parks of Japan
 Karst

References

External links
  Detailed map of Shikoku Karst Prefectural Natural Park

Parks and gardens in Ehime Prefecture
Seiyo, Ehime
Protected areas established in 1964
1964 establishments in Japan